Estíbaliz «Esty» Quesada (Baracaldo, July 30, 1994), also known as Soy una pringada, is a Spanish YouTuber, content creator, disc jockey, actress, and director.

Biography

Childhood 
She grew up in the Cruces neighborhood of the city of Baracaldo, in the province of Vizcaya. In her own words, she grew up in an unstructured family. Her father died when she was a child, and she lived with her two sisters and her mother, who did not take care of her daughters and often put her material whims before the feeding or basic care of the girls in her care. They also had debt problems. Quesada has also said that her maternal grandmother sexually abused her, but she didn't find out about this until she went to therapy as an adult.

All these traumas, added to the bullying she received at school for her selective mutism and her weight, marked a young Esty who began to self-harm and have suicidal thoughts from an early age.

YouTube 
In 2015, Esty started posting videos on YouTube to distract herself from problems.

In the videos on her channel, which she called Soy una pringada, she talks about topics related to the LGBT, makeup, television, film, internet and her personal experiences, from a pessimistic, humorous, ironic and irreverent perspective. She currently continues to upload videos to the platform, but sporadically.

Many of her videos have gone viral beyond her followers and have been controversial because of her hater side, among which Carlota Corredera, Gorda Tracionera, in which she criticizes the Telecinco presenter Carlota Corredera, and Odio a los heteros, in which she parodies and criticizes the macho behavior of cis–heterosexual men.

Professional career 
Thanks to the fame achieved with her YouTube channel and with her social networks in general, Quesada made the leap to television with Snacks de tele, a four-part series cancelled after the fifth broadcast due to its audience failure.

However, this did not stop her character from continuing to grow and becoming a mass phenomenon. It was then that she began to appear in films and television series. She was part of the cast of La llamada, a 2017 musical film directed by Javier Calvo and Javier Ambrossi, playing the supporting role of Marta. In addition, that same year, she was part of the Playz fiction Colegas.

In 2018, Atresmedia gave her the opportunity to direct and write her own series, Looser, broadcast on the digital platform Atresplayer (then called Flooxer) and produced by Javier Calvo and Javier Ambrossi, among others. Her debut as director was met with negative reviews for the lack of rhythm and structure in the series, which has had no continuity after the first season.

In 2019, it was announced she had signed for the TNT Spain series Vota Juan, starring Javier Cámara and María Pujalte, in which she plays the role of Eva Carrasco. In 2020, she continued playing the same character in the spin-off of the previous one called Vamos Juan.

In 2020, she co-starred with Nuria Roca in TNT's docu-realit Road Trip, in which the two drive from Miami to Nueva York in a van. After the good reception, that same year they began filming a second season, this time in Spain and with Carmina Barrios as a new traveling companion.

She has written two books: Freak in 2017 and Las cosas que me salvaron la vida in 2018 with publishers Hidroavión and Plan B, respectively, and since 2020 she has had her own podcast called Club de Fans de Shrek.

Controversies 
Quesada's radical statements have gotten her into a lot of trouble over the course of her career.

After her beginnings on Youtube in 2015, she gained popularity mainly due to a video published in May 2017 entitled Carlota Corredera: gorda traicionera,  in which she attacked said television presenter, referring to her as "a fat self-conscious woman who promotes body positivity and curviness after losing 60 kilos" and stating that "nobody has to make you feel bad about your weight, Carlota Corredera." Maybe you are a self-conscious fat girl who thinks that because you are fat, you don't deserve to live".

That same year, in the TV program Snacks de tele, she stated that "Andalusians are people, but maybe you are a little bit below the rest".

In 2021, she intervened in the Feroz Awards gala with a controversial monologue on ETA terrorism. A few months later, in September 2021, in the program La Fábrica de Gabriel Rufián she stated that Vox should be killed, that a limpet bomb should be placed in the wedding of Cristina Pedroche and Dabiz Muñoz, or that the influencer Pelayo Díaz "allegedly deserves death", as a result of which the said party announced that it was going to initiate legal action against both. In view of the controversy, Quesada apologized, claiming that she was speaking in a metaphorical way and stating that "I lost my way." I always speak in a humorous way, but perhaps this situation did not require it.  Rufián, for her part, distanced himself from Quesada's comments and said that she didn't agree with them, even though the show wasn't live but was a recording that could have been edited to take out those parts.

Private life 
She is openly bisexual.

Filmography

Cinema

Series

Programs

References 

Bisexual non-binary people
Spanish bisexual people
Spanish non-binary people
Spanish YouTubers
People from Barakaldo
DJs
Actors from the Basque Country (autonomous community)
Basque writers
Living people
1994 births
Agender people